Howie Wing is an American old-time radio juvenile aviation adventure serial. It was syndicated by the World Broadcasting System and distributed initially to stations in Canada, beginning on January 31, 1938. The Don Lee Network began carrying it in the western United States on February 12, 1938. The program was broadcast weekdays on CBS from October 3, 1938, until June 30, 1939.

Background
Bill Moore, who created and wrote Howie Wing, was one of the creators of another old-time radio aviation program, The Air Adventures of Jimmie Allen. Moore was a pilot with the Royal Flying Corps in World War I and a barnstorming pilot thereafter, both of which provided a background for his writing about aviation. An article in Radio Guide magazine described the program as "an authentic saga of aviation." Moore enhanced the show's authenticity by taking the cast and sound-effects people flying to help them appreciate the atmosphere needed for the program.

Story line
Howie Wing began as a flier with the Cadet Aviation Corps. Later, Captain Harvey, who owned an airline in South America, made Wing his co-pilot. The program's plots focused on Wing's battles against corruption, especially that involving Burton York, a saboteur who operated under the cover of being an insurance agent.

In light of research that showed 70 percent of the program's audience was children, the scripts avoided situations that might have been confusing for children.

Howie Wing was sponsored by Kellogg's.

Characters and cast
In addition to Wing, the program featured Captain Harvey, a veteran flier of World War I. Donna Cavendish was a stewardess who became Wing's love interest. Zero Smith was a disagreeable fellow pilot, Typhoon Tootel was the mechanic, and Burton York was the villain.

Characters in Howie Wing and the actors who portrayed them are shown in the table below.

The transcribed version had a different cast, which included Billie Rose, Audrey McGrath, Bill Bouchey, and Hugh Studebaker. Moore wrote and produced that program.

Legacy
In 1939, American Airlines named a flagship Howie Wing, the first time in air transportation history that a plane had been named for a radio program. The trade publication Broadcasting described the designation as "a tribute of the airline to the work of Kellogg Co. in making American youngsters air-minded."

References

External links

Logs
 Log of episodes of Howie Wing from Jerry Haendiges Vintage Radio Logs
 Log of episodes of Howie Wing from Old Time Radio Researchers Group
 Log of episodes of Howie Wing from radioGOLDINdex

Streaming
 Episodes of Howie Wing from Dumb.com
 Episodes of Howie Wing from Old Radio Programs

1938 radio programme debuts
1939 radio programme endings
1930s American radio programs
Don Lee Network programs
CBS Radio programs
Aviation radio series